Sir Robert Hormus Kotewall  (羅旭龢; 1880–1949) was a British Hong Kong businessman, civil servant and legislator.

Early life 
Kotewall was born in 1880. He was the son of Hormusjee Rustomjee Kotewall, an Indian Parsi, and Cheung A-cheung.

Career 
In 1913, Kotewall was named Clerk to the Magistracy and JP. By 1919, he was in trade as the manager of the Hong Kong Mercantile Company. In 1923, he was invited to join the Legislative Council as an unofficial member, a position he held until 1935. In 1936, he joined the Executive Council.

During the Japanese occupation of Hong Kong, Kotewall served as the chairman of the Japanese military government's Chinese Representative Council and assisted the Japanese Army in governing Hong Kong. After Sir Mark Young was restored as the governor of Hong Kong, Kotewall submitted a 66-page report explaining the causes and consequences of his actions as a Chinese representative during the Japanese occupation period, but it was not accepted by the British government. Although he was not prosecuted for treason, he was still blacklisted by the Hong Kong government and for the rest of his life would never again be appointed to official positions. At the same time, he was also listed as one of the traitors sought by the Guangdong government of the Republic of China, so he rarely subsequently participated in public life. Kotewall died in 1949.

Personal life 
Kotewall's wife was Edith (nee Lowcock) Kotewall (b. 1889). She was the daughter of George Lowcock and granddaughter of Henry Lowcock, an English businessman in Hong Kong.
They had 9 children. Through his daughter Maisie, his great-grandson is actor, Max Minghella. Through another daughter Patricia, his great-granddaughter is emcee, philanthropist and former Olympic swimmer Robyn Lamsam Convery, and his grandson is cricketer Roy Lamsam.

Legacy 
Kotewall Road, in Mid-Levels, Hong Kong Island, and Sir Robert Kotewall Hall in the campus of St. Paul's Co-educational College, are named after him. His daughter, Dr. Bobbie Kotewall, a teacher, became the principal of St. Paul's Co-educational College, where his sister (and her paternal aunt) Esther Kotewall had earlier served as vice principal.

Gallery

See also 
 St. Paul's Co-educational College

References

External links
 R. H. Kotewall (Lo Kuk-wu) 羅旭龢 from Biographies of Prominent Chinese c.1925.

Members of the Executive Council of Hong Kong
Members of the Legislative Council of Hong Kong
1880 births
1949 deaths
Hong Kong collaborators with Imperial Japan
Hong Kong people of Parsi descent
Companions of the Order of St Michael and St George
Knights Bachelor
People from British Hong Kong